Procecidocharoides penelope is a species of tephritid or fruit flies in the genus Procecidocharoides of the family Tephritidae.

Distribution
Canada, United States.

References

Tephritinae
Insects described in 1877
Diptera of North America
Taxa named by Carl Robert Osten-Sacken